The Internationales Turnier Berlin 1897 celebrated seventy years of the Berliner Schachgesellschaft. Twenty great chess masters started but Curt von Bardeleben had to withdraw after a short draw. They played in the Architektenhaus from September 13 to October 4, 1897. Eventually the event became a race between Rudolf Charousek and Carl August Walbrodt. The youngsters had prevailed at the end of the tiring event. The first won 2000 Mark and the second one - 1500 Mark. Unfortunately, they would die within a few years (Charousek in 1900, and Walbrodt in 1902).

The results and standings:

References

Chess competitions
Chess in Germany
1897 in chess
1897 in German sport
19th century in Berlin